The Chase may refer to:

Film
 The Chase (1946 film), an American film noir
 The Chase (1966 film), an American drama by Arthur Penn
 The Chase (1991 film), an American television film by Paul Wendkos
 The Chase (1994 film), an American comedy starring Charlie Sheen and Kristy Swanson
 The Chase (2017 film), a South Korean crime thriller
 The Chase, a 2006 short featuring Sherard Parker

Literature
 The Chase (novel), a novel by Clive Cussler
 The Chase, a novel by Janet Evanovich and Lee Goldberg
 The Chase, a collection of poems by John Figueroa
 The Chase, a children's novel by Roderick Hunt

Music

Albums
 The Chase (Garth Brooks album)
 The Chase (Illy album)
 The Chase (Marit Larsen album)
 The Chase (Manafest album)
 The Chase (Wolfstone album)
 The Chase!, a 1970 album by Dexter Gordon and Gene Ammons

Songs
 "Chase" (instrumental) or "The Chase", an instrumental by Giorgio Moroder
 "The Chase", a song by The Camelots
 "The Chase", a song by Clinic, produced for the film  Road to Salina
 "The Chase", an instrumental by Howard Jones, a B-side of the single No One Is to Blame
 "The Chase", a song by Queensrÿche from Operation: Mindcrime II
 "The Chase", a song by Rednex from The Best of the West
 "The Chase", an instrumental by Jan Hammer from the Miami Vice soundtrack
 "The Chase", a 2018 track by Toby Fox from Deltarune Chapter 1 OST from the video game Deltarune
 "The Chase", a song by Tinashe from 333

Television

Shows

 The Chase (British game show), a British game show
 The Chase (American game show), the American adaptation
 The Chase Australia, the Australian adaptation
 The Chase (2006 TV series), a British drama series

Episodes
 "The Chase" (Avatar: The Last Airbender)
 "The Chase" (Desperate Housewives)
 "The Chase" (Doctor Who)
 "The Chase" (Star Trek: The Next Generation)

Other uses
 The Chase Nature Reserve, a nature reserve in London, England
 The Chase School, a school in Malvern, Worcestershire, England
 Vytis, the heraldic coat of arms of Lithuania

See also 
 Chase (disambiguation)